Elborrego Airport  is an airport serving the La Loma coal mine and the town of La Loma in the Cesar Department of Colombia. The runway is adjacent to the mine and midway between La Loma and La Jagua de Ibirico.

See also

Transport in Colombia
List of airports in Colombia

References

External links
OpenStreetMap - Elborrego
FallingRain - Elborrego Airport

Airports in Colombia